Roca Redonda is a flat-topped, steep-sided islet located roughly  northwest of the island of Isabela, in the Galápagos Islands of Ecuador. Its isolation and inaccessibility coupled with its rocky cliffs riddled with crevices and crossed by ledges has made Roca Redonda a haven for nesting seabirds.

This small volcanic island is the remains of a large shield volcano that has vastly eroded away below sea level. Potassium–argon dating of Roca Redonda indicates that the islet is at least 53,000 +/- 54,000 years old. However, it remains unknown when the last eruption occurred from the shield volcano. Several shallow submarine fumaroles exist around the island and may indicate that the volcano is still active.

See also
Volcanoes of the Galápagos Islands
List of volcanoes in Ecuador

References

Islands of the Galápagos Islands
Volcanoes of the Galápagos Islands
Pleistocene shield volcanoes
Polygenetic shield volcanoes
Seabird colonies
Shield volcanoes of Ecuador
Potentially active volcanoes